C. J. Brown (born June 15, 1975) is an American soccer manager and former player. He currently serves as an assistant coach for Chicago Fire FC in Major League Soccer.

Early life
Brown was born Charles James Brown in Eugene, Oregon. He is of African American descent.

Career

College and amateur
Brown played college soccer at San Jose State University for four years.  He finished with 11 points (5 goals and 1 assist) and was named a two-time All-Conference Player in 1995 and 1996. Out of college, Brown was ignored by MLS, and instead joined the USISL's San Francisco Bay Seals between 1995 and 1997.

For the first two years, Brown played as an amateur while the Bay Seals played in USISL Premier League and he was still playing at San Jose. In 1997, the Bay Seals played in the USISL D-3 Pro League and made an improbable run to the Lamar Hunt U.S. Open Cup semifinals in 1997. His performances made Major League Soccer clubs take notice.

Professional
Brown was drafted first overall in the 1998 MLS Supplemental Draft by Chicago. He immediately stepped into the Fire's starting lineup and continued there until his retirement at the end of the 2010 season.

In his ten years and beyond in the league, Brown has played in 249 regular season games, first in team history.  He has also appeared in 32 playoff games, helping the Fire to the MLS Cup in 1998. Brown has scored four MLS goals in his career (three in the regular season and one in the playoffs).  He won the Lamar Hunt U.S. Open Cup in 1998, 2000, 2003, and 2006.

On October 21, 2010, Brown announced he would retire following the Fire's season finale two days later at Chivas USA which the team went on to win 4–1. Brown retired as the club's last remaining "Fire Original", and the all-time leader in competitive appearances (372), starts (364) and minutes (32,538). Brown sits behind only Jaime Moreno (415) and Cobi Jones (392) for most competitive appearances for one MLS team.

He also won the Chicago Fire/USSF Humanitarian of the Year from 2001 through 2003 for his efforts in his community.

On May 9, 2012 Brown was inducted into the Chicago Fire's Hall of Fame.

Post-professional
On January 18, 2010, Brown was hired as an assistant head coach for Real Salt Lake. He would assume the vacancy left by Robin Fraser, who left the club to coach Chivas USA.  On December 11, 2013, Brown was named assistant coach of the Chicago Fire, where he won an MLS Cup as a player in 1998. After almost a year he moved to expansion club New York City FC on December 1, 2014, rejoining Jason Kreis, who he had worked under at Real Salt Lake.

On November 2, 2015, New York City FC, disappointed with not making the 2015 MLS Cup Playoffs, announced they had parted ways with Head Coach Jason Kreis as well as Brown and assistant Miles Joseph after just one year of management and would be looking for a new head coach for the following season.

On July 10, 2018, the New York Red Bulls announced that Brown would be joining newly appointed head coach Chris Armas' staff as an assistant.

On February 2, 2021, Brown was announced as the first technical director and head coach for Chicago House AC, a new professional soccer team in the National Independent Soccer Association. Later that year on March 11, Brown was announced as an assist coach for the United States men's national under-23 soccer team ahead of the 2020 CONCACAF Men's Olympic Qualifying Championship.

Brown rejoined the Fire on December 20, 2021, as a member of head coach Ezra Hendrickson's coaching staff.

International
After emerging from soccer obscurity, Brown amassed 15 caps with the United States national team, his first coming on November 6, 1998 against Australia.  He played in the US's third-place finish at the 1999 FIFA Confederations Cup, when he was involved in one of the biggest surprises for the U.S during the tournament, playing 90 min. on July 2 vs. Germany, in the U.S.'s 2–0 win. He also appeared in two games for the U.S. in the 2000 Gold Cup, playing 18 min. as a second-half sub on February 16 vs. Peru – a 1–0 win – and on February 2, as the Americans downed Haiti 3–0, he also participated in the Olympic Festival in 1994 and 1995.

Club
Statistics accurate as of January 5, 2014.

Honors

Santa Cruz Surf
USISL Pacific Division Rookie of the Year
Winner: (1): 1993

Chicago Fire
MLS Cup
Winners (1): 1998
Runners-up (2): 2000, 2003
Supporters' Shield
Winners (1): 2003
Lamar Hunt U.S. Open Cup
Winners (4): 1998, 2000, 2003, 2006
Runners-up (1): 2004
Chicago Fire Defender of the Year:
Winner: (2): 2006, 2010
Chicago Fire Humanitarian of the Year:
Winner: (3): 2001, 2002, 2003

United States
FIFA Confederations Cup:
Third Place (1): 1999

Personal
Brown married wife Kim on October 22, 2000, the day after winning the 2000 U.S. Open Cup Championship. The couple welcomed their first daughter, Canessa Brown on February 24, 2004. Their second daughter, Kali Brown was born exactly one year later, on February 24, 2005.

References

External links

1975 births
Living people
1999 FIFA Confederations Cup players
2000 CONCACAF Gold Cup players
Major League Soccer players
Major League Soccer All-Stars
African-American soccer players
American soccer players
Chicago Fire FC players
Association football defenders
Sportspeople from Eugene, Oregon
San Francisco Seals (soccer) players
San Jose State Spartans men's soccer players
Soccer players from Oregon
United States men's international soccer players
USL League Two players
USL Second Division players
San Francisco Soccer Football League players
Chicago Fire FC draft picks
Real Salt Lake non-playing staff
Chicago Fire FC non-playing staff
New York City FC non-playing staff
Orlando City SC non-playing staff
National Independent Soccer Association coaches
American soccer coaches
21st-century African-American sportspeople
20th-century African-American sportspeople